Vayssierea felis is a species of sea slug, a dorid nudibranch, a marine gastropod mollusk in the family Okadaiidae.

Description 
This red-orange nudibranch can grow up to 6mm in size. It reproduces by direct development and lays an egg  mass of 3-5 eggs.

Range
This species was originally named in the South China sea, however many argue that all Vayssierea are one species with a wider range that occurs in the Indo-West Pacific. It has also recently been documented in its non-native range in San Diego, CA.

Habitat 
This species can be found in the intertidal zone, usually associated with the Spirorbis tube worms they eat.

Ecology 
V. felis feeds on Spirorbis tube worms in the intertidal zone.

Taxonomy 
This species, originally found in the South China Sea, was named Trevelyana felis by Collingwood in 1881. It genus was later changed when more information was discovered. The exact taxonomic placement of this organism is still debated and many people believe that all Vayssierea spp. should be under this one species name.

References

Okadaiidae
Gastropods described in 1881